Moyencharia herhausi is a moth of the family Cossidae. It is found in south-western Burkina Faso and probably south-eastern Mali. The habitat consists of a mosaic of wooded farmland and Sudanian woodland with pockets of dry and riparian forests at low elevations.

The wingspan is about 26 mm. The forewings are warm buff and light orange yellow mixed with ivory yellow. The hindwings are warm buff mixed with ivory yellow.

Etymology
The species is named for Frank Herhaus.

References

Moths described in 2013
Moyencharia